Phacelia rattanii is a species of phacelia known by the common name Rattan's phacelia.

It is native to northern California, Nevada, and the West Coast of the United States. It can be found in mountain and foothill habitats, in shaded crevices and on steep slopes.

Description
Phacelia rattanii is an annual herb growing 15 centimeters to one meter in maximum stem length, taking an erect, branching form. It is glandular and coated in stiff hairs and bristles with bulbous bases. The leaves are oval, toothed or lobed, and up to about 7 centimeters long. The hairy inflorescence is a one-sided curving or coiling cyme of bell-shaped flowers each no more than half a centimeter long. The flowers are white to light blue and are surrounded by calyces of sepals coated in long hairs.

External links
Jepson Manual Treatment of Phacelia rattanii
Phacelia rattanii — UC Photo gallery

rattanii
Flora of California
Flora of Idaho
Flora of Nevada
Flora of Oregon
Flora of the Cascade Range
Flora of the Klamath Mountains
Natural history of the California chaparral and woodlands
Natural history of the California Coast Ranges
Natural history of the San Francisco Bay Area
Flora without expected TNC conservation status